Lipka (Czech/Slovak feminine: Lipková) is a surname. Notable people with this surname include:

 Alfred Lipka (1931–2010), Czech-born German violist
 František Lipka (born 1946), Slovak diplomat and poet
 Frédéric Lipka (born 1968), French figure skater
 Kasia Lipka (born 1993), English footballer
 Leszek Lipka (born 1958), Polish footballer
 Mark Lipka, comic book artist
 Matt Lipka (born 1992), American baseball player
 Robert Lipka (1945–2013), American spy
 Warren Lipka, American footballer

See also
 

Czech-language surnames
Polish-language surnames
Slovak-language surnames